Bond is an unincorporated community in Hickman County, in the U.S. state of Tennessee.

History
The community was likely named for Joseph McRea Bond, a local pioneer.

References

Unincorporated communities in Hickman County, Tennessee
Unincorporated communities in Tennessee